Don L. Phillips is a former American football and basketball coach.  He served as the head football coach at Bethany College in West Virginia (1946–1947), Shepherd College (1948–1950), and West Virginia Institute of Technology (1951–1956), compiling a career college football record of 42–47–3.  Phillips was also the head basketball coach at Shepherd from 1949 to 1951, tallying a mark of 17–24.

Head coaching record

Football

References

Year of birth missing
Possibly living people
Bethany Bison football coaches
Shepherd Rams football coaches
Shepherd Rams men's basketball coaches
Sportspeople from Maywood, Illinois
West Virginia Tech Golden Bears football coaches
Wheaton College (Illinois) alumni